The Dean Forest Act 1819 (59 Geo 3 c 86) is an Act of the Parliament of the United Kingdom.

Sections 1 to 6 were repealed by section 1(4) of, and the Schedule to, the Wild Creatures and Forest Laws Act 1971.

Sections 9 to 11 were repealed by Part IX of the Schedule to the Statute Law (Repeals) Act 1971.

See also
English land law
Dean Forest Act 1667
Dean Forest (Encroachments) Act 1838
Dean Forest Act 1842
Dean Forest Act 1861

References
Halsbury's Statutes,
The Statutes of the United Kingdom of Great Britain and Ireland. 59 George III. 1819. Printed by His Majesty's Statute and Law Printers. London. 1819. Pages 492 to 497.

External links
The Dean Forest Act 1819, as amended, from the National Archives.
The Dean Forest Act 1819, as originally enacted, from the National Archives.

United Kingdom Acts of Parliament 1819
English forest law
Forest of Dean
19th century in Gloucestershire